Yuntai Mountain (云台山) could refer to the following mountains:

Yuntai Mountain (Henan), near Jiaozuo, Henan
, near Lianyungang, Jiangsu
Yuntai Mountain (Matsu), in Nan'gang, Lienchiang